Renhua County (postal: Yanfa) is a county in the northernmost portion of Guangdong province, in China, bordering Jiangxi to the northeast and Hunan to the northwest. It is under the administration of the prefecture-level city of Shaoguan.

History
Upon the Nanyue capitulation to the Han dynasty, the area of present-day Renhua County was incorporated as Qujiang County.

In 479 CE, during the Southern Qi, Renhua County was carved out of Qujiang County. However, during the Liang dynasty, Renhua County was merged back into Qujiang County.

In 688 CE, during the reign of Emperor Ruizong of the Tang dynasty, Renhua County was re-established. Renhua County remained intact until 973 CE, during the reign of Emperor Taizu of the Song dynasty, when it was merged into Lechang County. In 1000 CE, under the reign of Emperor Zhenzong, Renhua County was again re-established.

In 1949, the People's Liberation Army took control of Renhua County as part of Beijiang zone of Guangdong. The Communist government then established the People's Government of Renhua County.

In 1958, Renhua County was abolished and placed under the direct jurisdiction of Shaoguan. Renhua County was re-established in 1961.

In 1968, the Renhua County people's committee was withdrawn, and a revolutionary committee was established, which belongs to the revolutionary committee of Shaoguan District.

In 1980, People's Government of Renhua County was restored and put under the jurisdiction of Shaoguan District.

In 1983, Shaoguan was upgraded to a prefecture.

Geography

Renhua County is located in the far north of Guangdong province, and borders the provinces of Jiangxi and Hunan. It borders Shixing County and Nanxiong to the east, Qujiang District to the south, Lechang and Zhenjiang District to the west, Rucheng County in Hunan province to the north, and both Chongyi County and Dayu County in Jiangxi province to the northeast.

The county is located along the southern foot of the Nanling Mountains, and has mostly mountainous terrain.

Renhua is located just north of the Tropic of Cancer.

Climate 
It has a subtropical monsoon climate (Köppen classification Cfa).

Administrative divisions

Renhua County administers 1 subdistrict and 10 towns. These township-level divisions then, in turn, administer 109 village-level divisions.

Demographics 
As of the 2010 Chinese Census, Renhua County has a population of 200,354, up from the 163,213 recorded in the 2000 Chinese Census. A 2011 estimate put Renhua County's population at 201,700 people, and a 2008 report stated Renhua County had 229,861 hukou holders. In 1996, Renhua County's population was estimated at 180,000.

Languages 
The most commonly spoken languages in Renhua County are Cantonese, Mandarin, and Hakka. Some of towns speaking Shaozhou Tuhua (Sat Na Wa).

Tourism

Notable natural features in Renhua County include Mount Danxia, and Mount Wanshi Grassland, one of the rare grasslands in Guangdong province.

Mount Danxia 

Nicknamed "The Red Stone Park of China", it is the largest attraction by area in Guangdong province, covering . It is formed by red lake and river gravel rock from 70 thousand years. In addition, it has the shape most abundant among Danxia land-form, especially the male and female stone. It is mainly divided into the Danxia scenic area, Shao Shi Xian traveled scenic, attractions, scenic spots and scenic Jinjiang gallery. In 1988, Mount Danxia was listed as a National Park of China, a National Nature Reserve, a National Geopark, and a National 5A Tourist Attraction. In 2004, Danxia Mountain was listed as a UNESCO Global Geopark. Mount Danxia has a lot of resources including 1,916 kind of plants, 88 mammals, 288 birds, 86 reptiles, 37 amphibians, 100 fishes and 1,023 insects.

Mount Wanshi Grassland
The mountain is also known as Mount Sishui in Hunan, and Mount Fanzi in Jiangxi. Like Mount Danxia, Mount Wanshi is a Danxia landform. Mount Wanshi is the source of the Jin River.

Mount Wanshi was the site of battles during the Chinese Civil War, and part of the Long March passed through Mount Wanshi.

Mount Wanshi is a popular regional destination for ecotourism.

Shuangfeng Fort 

Shuangfeng Fort served as a defensive fort, made from limestone and ancient black brick which made it very strong. The fort is surrounded by a  moat. In 1928, forces from the Red Army and the Kuomintang fought at Shuangfeng Fort. In 2006, Shuangfeng Fort was approved by the State Council on the sixth batch of national key cultural relic unit under state protection list.

Chengkou Guqincheng 
It controlled the route from Guangdong Province to Hunan Province as it east village was fixed up the city group, south * en streams (where the west water), west street, north to SanJiaoPing to old salt. It was built under the administration of Nanyue emperor Zhao Tuo, but was rebuilt in Qing dynasty after being destroyed.

Yunlong Pagoda 

The pagoda was originally called Xishan Pagoda, but was renamed in the Qing dynasty. The pagoda's architecture is distinct to the Tang dynasty.

In January 1988, the State Council announced it as a national key cultural relics protection unit.

Sixi Pagoda 

Also located in Dongtang, Sixi Pagoda faces Yunlong Pagoda across Sixi Mountain. It was built in 1075 and listed as the second paper unit of Guangdong Province. It not only has an architectural feature of Tang Dynasty, but with the style of Song dynasty. It is a loft-style tower which made of examinations in the imitation wood for external, the door with arch plane, shape likes flat square, round flat seat Chuanxin wall internal, with blue bricks' Chuanxin ladder, can connect to the top floor.

Cuisine

Cuisine in Renhua County includes Shitang rice wine, Field-snail casserole, Hongshan white-hair tea, Danxia pickled radish, Huangkeng citrus Gonggan, and Xiafu pomelo.

Shitang rice wine 

Shitang rice wine has a history of more than 300 years. The unique taste is attributed to the requirement that it must be made with local water. The foam from Shitang Rice Wine often accumulates in cups, giving it the nickname "stacking flowers".

Field-snail casserole 
Field-snail casserole is one of the local feather foodies. The dish is made with locally planted betel nut palm. It is locally used to dispel the cold.

Hongshan white-hair tea 

Hongshan white-hair tea was used as a royal tribute during the Qing dynasty. The tea is a kind of green tea which has the leaves' white "hair" in it. The tea tastes sweet and delicate, and is the first of three white-hair tea in China.

Danxia pickled radish 
Danxia Pickled Radish is made a by local secret recipe, and is round, crispy, and acidic.

Huangkeng citrus Gonggan 

Huangkeng has a special climate and soil condition which is suitable for Gonggan growing. Huangkeng citrus Gonggang is characterized by its uniquely thin skin, seedless-ness, and sweet flesh.

Xiafu Pomelo 
Xiafu pomelo is sweet and fragrant. With its climate and soil conditions the shape, flesh, and taste of Xiafu pomelo is the similar to pomelo from Shatian Guangxi.

See also 

 Mount Danxia
 Nanyue
 Shaoguan

References

 
County-level divisions of Guangdong
Shaoguan